Songs for a Hurricane is an album by singer/songwriter Kris Delmhorst, released in 2003.

Reception

Music critic Joe Viglione wrote in his Allmusic  "This artist is subtle in her approach with music that comes up behind you and a voice that breathes through the speakers... The production by Delmhorst and Billy Conway is commendable, and the different instruments by a host of musicians find their place, all the elements part of a fabric. The singer doesn't use her voice to command the album as most artists do, but there are textures here, flashes of lyrical brilliance with lap steel guitars, accordion, xylophone, fiddle, and cello weaving in and out... Captivating and very intriguing."

Track listing 
All songs by Kris Delmhorst unless noted.
 "Waiting Under the Waves" – 3:38
 "East of the Mountains" – 2:37
 "You're No Train" – 5:35
 "Bobby Lee" – 3:07
 "Weathervane" – 3:26
 "Juice + June" – 4:01
 "Hummingbird" – 4:33
 "Hurricane" – 4:19
 "Come Home" – 2:16
 "Too Late" – 4:04
 "Wasted Word" – 3:22
 "Short Work" –  2:55
 "Mingalay" (Delmhorst, Traditional) – 5:51

Personnel
Kris Delmhorst – vocals, electric and acoustic guitar, fiddle, cello, baritone guitar
Kevin Barry – guitar, lap steel guitar
Jabe "Charlie The Bubble Palantino" Beyer – guitar, background vocals
Dana Colley – background vocals
Billy Conway – drums, percussion, background vocals
Mark Erelli – guitar, background vocals
Steve Mayone – guitar
Andrew Mazzone – bass, 8-string sass, baritone guitar
Julie Wolf – organ, piano, accordion, xylophone, Melodica, Wurlitzer, background vocals

Production
 Produced by Kris Delmhorst and Billy Conway
 Engineered by Paul Q. Kolderie, Billy Conway, Jason Raboin and Dana Colley
 Mixed by Paul Q. Kolderie
 Mastered by Dave Locke
 Photography by Megan Summers

References

External links
 Official Kris Delmhorst website
Signature Sounds Recordings

2003 albums
Kris Delmhorst albums